Antonio de la Torre García (born November 18, 1977,) is a Mexican-American former soccer defender, who recently played for the Atlanta Silverbacks of the USL First Division.  De la Torre holds dual citizenship in Mexico and the United States.

Before joining MLS, de la Torre played most of his career in Mexico's Primera A, the second division. He played for Atlante F.C. in the Primera Division.

He joined MLS for the 2004 season, signing with the Colorado Rapids, and immediately impressed with his offensive abilities.  Unlike most American defenders, de la Torre was a danger going forward from his right back position, and finished the season with five assists in 28 starts.  However, near the end of the season, coach Tim Hankinson grew tired of de la Torre's defensive failures, and benched him for the playoffs.

Following the end of the season, de la Torre was exposed for the 2004 MLS Expansion Draft, where he was selected fifth overall by C.D. Chivas USA, but was cut before the season. He signed with Atlanta soon after.

De la Torre's father, Antonio de la Torre Villalpando, played in Mexico during the 70's and 80's, and appeared for Mexico during the 1978 World Cup tournament. His uncle, "Chepo", is the head coach of CD Guadalajara of the Primera División de México , actually he works as a construction worker in Atlanta and RETO

References

External links
 
 

1977 births
Living people
Mexican footballers
Atlanta Silverbacks players
Colorado Rapids players
Footballers from Guadalajara, Jalisco
American sportspeople of Mexican descent
Mexican emigrants to the United States
Expatriate soccer players in the United States
Major League Soccer players
USL First Division players
Association football midfielders